Persoonia rufiflora is a species of flowering plant in the family Proteaceae and is endemic to the south-west of Western Australia. It is an erect, sometimes spreading shrub with hairy young branchlets, lance-shaped to linear leaves, and hairy, greenish yellow flowers arranged singly or in pairs.

Description
The flowers are arranged singly or in pairs, with a scale leaf at the base.

Taxonomy
Persoonia rufiflora was first formally described in 1855 by Carl Meissner in Hooker's Journal of Botany and Kew Garden Miscellany from specimens collected by James Drummond.

Distribution and habitat
This geebung grows in heath and mallee woodland between Kalbarri National Park and the Mogumber area in the south-west of Western Australia.

Conservation status
Persoonia rufiflora is classified as "not threatened" by the Government of Western Australia Department of Parks and Wildlife.

References

rufiflora
Flora of Western Australia
Plants described in 1855
Taxa named by Carl Meissner